"New" is a song written by Paul McCartney. It was originally recorded by McCartney and produced by English musician Mark Ronson for McCartney's sixteenth studio album New, and appears as the sixth track on the album. After being released early on the iTunes Store as a track available to download from New on 28 August 2013, the song was released as a single on 2 September 2013 and available exclusively on Amazon.com. The single's premiere on 28 August was concurrent with the official reveal of New on the same day. The single gained heavy airplay on Japanese radio stations, where it became a number 4 hit on the Japan Hot 100.

The single joined BBC Radio 2's playlist and the album of the same name was their Record of the Week.

The song appears in both the opening and the end credits of the 2013 animated film Cloudy with a Chance of Meatballs 2.

Reception
"New" was greeted positively by critics and the musical press. As well as being selected as BBC Radio 2's Record of the Week and placed on their A-list, the track was greeted as the "Track of the Day" by Mojo which praised its "doe-eyed optimism, irresistible melody" and "orchestrated pop arrangements". Rolling Stone Will Hermes, praised its "bouncy harpsichord-laden melody", giving it a four-star rating and drawing comparisons to the Beatles' "Got to Get You into My Life", a view shared by The Daily Telegraph which described it as a "jaunty, Beatles-esque stomp".

Live performances
McCartney performed the song live on late night shows such as Jimmy Kimmel Live and Late Night with Jimmy Fallon as well as at the iHeartRadio Music Festival where he premiered it as well as several other songs off the new album.

Personnel
Paul McCartney – vocals, bass guitar, harpsichord, piano, mellotron, Wurlitzer electric piano, congas, maracas, bouzouki
Rusty Anderson – backing vocals, guitar, bouzouki
Brian Ray – backing vocals, guitar
Abe Laboriel Jr. – backing vocals, drums
Paul Wickens – backing vocals
Steve Sidwell – trumpet
Jamie Talbot – tenor saxophone
Dave Bishop – baritone saxophone

Track listing

Chart performance

Release history

References

Paul McCartney songs
Songs written by Paul McCartney
Song recordings produced by Mark Ronson
2013 songs
2013 singles
Universal Music Group singles